Armed Forces & Society is a quarterly peer-reviewed academic publication that publishes articles and book reviews on a wide variety of topics including civil–military relations, military sociology, veterans, military psychology, military institutions, conflict management, peacekeeping, conflict resolution, military contracting, terrorism, gender related issues, military families  and military ethics. It is the official publication of the Inter-University Seminar on Armed Forces and Society and published by SAGE Publications. The current editor-in-chief is Patricia M. Shields (Texas State University).

The journal was established in 1974 by Morris Janowitz (University of Chicago) and became the "first professional journal to focus on the connection between the military and society in an international and interdisciplinary way."

Abstracting and indexing
According to the Journal Citation Reports, the journal has a 2020 impact factor of 1.829.

Editors-in-chief
The following persons are or have been editors-in-chief:
Morris Janowitz (1973–1983)
David R. Segal (1983–1989)
Claude E. Welch Jr. (1989–1992)
Jay Stanley (1992–1995)
James Burk (1995–1998)
Mark Eitelberg (1998–2001)
Patricia M. Shields (2001–present)

See also
Journal of Peace Research
Parameters
Naval War College Review
Journal of Conflict Resolution
International Security
Security Studies
Military Review

References

External links

Publications established in 1974
Military journals
International relations journals
Quarterly journals
English-language journals
SAGE Publishing academic journals